Route 22 is a short  north–south Massachusetts state route that connects Route 1A and Route 127 in Beverly and Route 133 in Essex. The entire route is located within Essex County.

Route description
Route 22 begins in downtown Beverly, where it intersects Cabot Street (Route 1A). Route 22 proceeds along Essex Street, heading northward out of the downtown area and past the Montserrat MBTA commuter rail station. Route 22 crosses Route 128 at exit 47 (formerly exit 18), and then winds northward into Wenham, making two turns before quickly entering Hamilton. It then makes another turn in Hamilton, onto another Essex Street, which in turn crosses into the town of Essex north of Chebaco Lake. Route 22 ends at Route 133 in downtown Essex, near the head of the Essex River.

Major intersections

References

022